Richard Corish (17 September 1886 – 19 July 1945) was an Irish politician and trade unionist.

Early and personal life
Born in Wexford in 1886, Corish was the eldest child of carpenter Peter Corish and Mary Murphy. He was educated by the Christian Brothers in the town. As a fitter in the Wexford Engineering foundry he was blacklisted by his employers after the 1911 Lockout, and became a trade union official in the new Irish Foundry Workers' Union.

In 1913, he married Katherine Bergin and they had six children.

Politics
Richard Corish became Mayor of Wexford in 1920 as an Irish Labour Party representative. However, as the Labour Party in the southern 26 counties, later the Irish Free State, chose not to contest the 1921 elections, Corish ran as a Sinn Féin candidate and was elected to Dáil Éireann for the Wexford constituency. He supported the Anglo-Irish Treaty and voted in favour of it. He ran as a member of the Labour Party at the 1922 general election. He served in the Dáil and as Mayor of Wexford until his death in 1945.

His death caused a by-election to the Dáil which was won by his son, Brendan Corish, who was later a leader of the Labour Party and Tánaiste.

Corish was a member of the Irish National Foresters, and was its High Chief Ranger in 1942.

See also
Families in the Oireachtas

References

External links
 

1886 births
1945 deaths
Labour Party (Ireland) TDs
Members of the 2nd Dáil
Members of the 3rd Dáil
Members of the 4th Dáil
Members of the 5th Dáil
Members of the 6th Dáil
Members of the 7th Dáil
Members of the 8th Dáil
Members of the 9th Dáil
Members of the 10th Dáil
Members of the 11th Dáil
Members of the 12th Dáil
Politicians from County Wexford
Early Sinn Féin TDs